In the field of law and economics, the English rule is a rule controlling assessment of lawyers' fees arising out of litigation. The English rule provides that the party that loses in court pays the other party's legal costs. The English rule contrasts with the American rule, under which each party is generally responsible for paying its own attorney fees (unless a statute or contract provides for that assessment). The American rule can make it easier for a poor person to bring suit, but by the same token it gives everyone more risk of being sued. Some argue that the American system encourages frivolous or "extortionate" suits against businesses with "deep pockets," because plaintiffs can have a contingency fee arrangement with the attorney whereby they pay nothing to the attorney if the case loses. Under a contingent fee arrangement, the attorney for the plaintiff faces no consequences, other than lost time and effort, for bringing a suit that loses, but he can collect huge fees (typically 30% to 40% of the damages awarded) if he wins. By the same token, wealthy defendants have a strong incentive to pay the plaintiff to get a settlement, if they face a small chance of having to pay a huge amount. The rationale for the English rule is that a litigant (whether bringing a claim or defending a claim) is entitled to legal representation and, if successful, should not be left out of pocket by reason of their own legal fees. It should be borne in mind that, in virtually all English civil litigation, damages are merely compensatory.

The English rule is followed by nearly every Western democracy other than the United States.

United States jurisdictions
In the United States the "American rule" is generally followed, each party bearing its own expense of litigation. However,  provides that in patent cases, the losing party may have to pay attorney fees of the winning party if the case is deemed "exceptional." However, after the U.S. Supreme Court's decision in Octane Fitness, LLC v. ICON Health & Fitness, Inc. on April 29, 2014, it is now easier for courts to award costs for frivolous patent lawsuits initiated by patent trolls.

Alaska has long been an exception to the U.S. pattern, where the English rule applies. A very limited version of the English rule was adopted in Texas during the 2011 legislative session that applies only to the filing of a baseless lawsuit. Tex. R. Civ. P. 91a.
Then Texas governor Rick Perry called in his state of the state address for a one-way version of the English rule which would apply only to those who initiate a suit, the plaintiff.

See also
Costs in English law
American rule (attorney's fees)

References

Black's Law Dictionary (8th Ed. 2004).

External links
 Walter Olson, "Loser Pays"
 GS2Law comments on the differences with US

Civil law (common law)